Market Place is the financial programme broadcast Monday to Friday at 10:30pm in Hong Kong by television channel TVB Pearl.

History
On February 2, 2009, Market Place programme changed to High Definition.

TVB
TVB original programming